Myelin regulatory factor (MyRF), also known as myelin gene regulatory factor (MRF), is a protein that in humans is encoded by the MYRF gene.

Orthologs 

Myelin regulatory factor is encoded by the Myrf/GM98 gene in mice and by the MYRF gene in humans. The family of MyRF-like-proteins also contains the orthologues pqn-47 from C. elegans and MYRFA from Dictyostelium.  All orthologs have a DNA-binding domain of high homology to the Saccharomyces cerevisiae protein Ndt80 (a p53-like transcription factor) and therefore likely act as a transcription factor.

Function 

MyRF is a transcription factor that promotes the expression of many genes important in the production of myelin. It is therefore of critical importance in the development and maintenance of myelin sheaths.

The expression of MYRF is specific to mature, myelinating oligodendrocytes in the CNS.  It has been shown to be critical for the maintenance of myelin by these cells. Following ablation of MYRF the expression of myelin genes such as PLP1, MBP, MAG and MOG drops rapidly. Therefore, MYRF is a key regulator and likely a direct activator of the expression of these genes.

Animal models 

Mice that lose MYRF during adulthood present with a severe demyelination similar to that seen in animal models of multiple sclerosis. This underlines the importance of an active renewal of proteins in the myelin sheath. Further, the activity of MYRF increases during remyelination, suggesting it has a critical role in this process. Animals with repressed Myrf in a proportion of oligodendrocyte precursor cells showed a delayed functional recovery from spinal cord injury.

Myrf has been shown to be significantly downregulated in a mouse model carrying the same mutation in the NPC1 protein that is underlying Niemann-Pick type C1 disease, a neurodegenerative process in which dysmyelination is a main pathogenic factor. Therefore, a disruption of oligodendrocyte formation and myelination may be the root cause of the neurological abnormalities.

References 

Transcription factors